Scotiabank Theatre (French: Cinémas Banque Scotia) is a Canadian banner of multiplex cinemas owned by Cineplex Entertainment. The brand was established in 2007 as part of a wider partnership between Cineplex and Scotiabank on their new Scene loyalty program.

The brand is positioned as Cineplex's flagship banner, encompassing ten locations in major markets with a focus on offering premium amenities and formats. They include three locations that formerly operated under the Paramount Theatres brand prior to the acquisition of Famous Players by Cineplex (including the flagship Toronto location), as well as locations rebranded from other Cineplex banners.

History

The first four locations opened in Montreal, Toronto, Calgary and Vancouver by Famous Players as Paramount theatres. The Paramount Theatre banner was the trademark of Paramount Pictures, the film studio of former owner Famous Players' parent company Viacom. In 2005, Viacom sold Famous Players to Cinema Galaxy Income Fund — owner of Cineplex Galaxy Cinemas — creating the company Cineplex Entertainment. The theatres were rebranded as Scotiabank Theatres, under a sponsorship arrangement with Canadian bank Scotiabank. In 2007, Cineplex Entertainment and Scotiabank expanded their partnership by extending the Scotiabank Theatre banner nationwide, including the rebranding of other remaining Paramount Theatre locations, and by launching the "Scene" entertainment rewards program.

The St. John's and Halifax locations were originally owned by Empire Theatres, but were purchased by Cineplex and rebranded as Cineplex Cinemas in October 2013, then to the Scotiabank Theatre brand in November 2014. Three more locations were formerly branded as SilverCity: the West Edmonton Mall location was rebranded on May 2, 2007, while Ottawa and Winnipeg were rebranded in the summer of 2016.

Three Scotiabank Theatre locations premiered the Barco Escape premium large format in Canada on July 22, 2016.

Features

Premium screens
 4DX is currently available at both Alberta locations and the Ottawa location.
 D-Box motion theatre technology is available at all Scotiabank Theatre locations. Normally, only one auditorium per location features this technology, but Calgary (Chinook) and Vancouver each have two such motion theatres.
 Four locations, including those with two D-Box auditoriums, offer a D-Box UltraAVX option. This combines the motion theatre technology with 4K resolution and enhanced Dolby sound.
 IMAX is available at most locations, except for Saskatoon and Vancouver. All locations offer Digital IMAX technology, but Scotiabank Theatre Toronto features IMAX with Laser, a significant improvement with 4K resolution and better colour. As of July 2017, IMAX 70 mm film playback is available at both Alberta locations. Cinemas in Ottawa, Toronto and Winnipeg discontinued film playback.
 ScreenX features a 270-degree panoramic screen, and is available at the Toronto, Vancouver, Calgary and Halifax locations.
 Cineplex previously offered Barco Escape at these locations and at the Edmonton location. This format premiered in Canada on July 22, 2016 with Star Trek Beyond, featuring 20 minutes of the film optimised for this format.
 UltraAVX is available at most locations, except for Ottawa, Winnipeg and Atlantic locations. These theatres offer 4K resolution and enhanced Dolby sound.
 VIP Cinemas is exclusively available in three auditoriums at Scotiabank Theatre Saskatoon.

Virtual reality
In November 2017, an IMAX VR centre opened at Scotiabank Theatre Toronto, as IMAX VR's first location in Canada. The following month, a D-Box VR experience launched at the Ottawa location.

Locations

There are currently ten locations:

Restaurants
As with many Cineplex locations, Scotiabank Theatre offers pizza and coffee at all of its locations. Montreal adds two Tim Hortons restaurants: a larger one on Saint Catherine Street that is accessible to the public, and a smaller one near the concession stand that is only available to theatre patrons. As these are Cineplex locations, they will accept Cineplex gift cards and Scotiabank Scene rewards, but not Tim Hortons gift cards. In 2022, it was removed completely and Starbucks took over the space outside the cinema. Alcohol is served at the Edmonton, Ottawa, Saskatoon and Toronto locations. Ottawa and Toronto have all their auditoriums licensed for alcohol consumption. The Saskatoon location only has its VIP auditoriums licensed for alcohol.

Gaming
Xscape arcade are available at Scotiabank Theatre locations, except for the Vancouver location. These arcades use swipe cards instead of token coins. Scotiabank Theatre Vancouver features coin-operated claw cranes instead.

See also
 List of Cineplex Entertainment movie theatres

References

Theatres in Canada
Cineplex Entertainment
Scotiabank
Paramount Global
Paramount Pictures